Hamzehlu is a village in Zanjan Province, Iran.

Hamzehlu may also refer to:
 Hamzehlu-ye Olya, Hamadan Province
 Hamzehlu-ye Sofla, Hamadan Province
 Hamzehlu Rural District, in Markazi Province